Beynost is a commune in the Ain department, Auvergne-Rhône-Alpes region in eastern France. The commune is approximately 15 km from Lyon, and part of the unité urbaine de Lyon. Historically, Beynost is also part of the naturally forming region of Côtière. Beynost station has rail connections to Lyon, Ambérieu-en-Bugey and Chambéry.

Politics and administration

List of mayors

Population

See also
Communes of the Ain department

References

Communes of Ain
Ain communes articles needing translation from French Wikipedia